Vincent Joseph Papale (born October 17, 1996) is an American football wide receiver for the Memphis Showboats of the United States Football League (USFL). He is the son of former Philadelphia Eagles receiver Vince Papale, whose career was the basis of the 2006 film Invincible.

Early life
Vinny Papale was born on October 17, 1996, in Cherry Hill, New Jersey. He went to high school at Bishop Eustace High School, playing football, lacrosse, and track & field. Due to the high school's small football team, Papale played on offense, defense, and special teams. He was a three-year starter at wide receiver, and two-year starter at defensive back. He was a three-time all-conference selection. He was named team captain as a senior. In his high school career, he contributed 64 receptions for 985 yards, 60 tackles, and seven interceptions. He also was selected to play in the USA Football International Bowl and the Blue-Grey All-America game in 2014.

College career
Papale played college football at the University of Delaware. In his first season, he was one of only three true freshmen to see action, appearing in five games. His only statistic was a 28-yard reception. His one catch was the fourth-longest Delaware completion of the season. He made appearances against Lafayette, Villanova, William & Mary, Rhode Island, and New Hampshire.

In Papale's sophomore year, he started the first six games before suffering a season-ending injury against William & Mary. He recorded three catches for forty-two yards in the season.

He played in all 11 games in 2017, amassing 15 receptions for 178 yards.

He had his best season during his senior year, with 36 catches for 618 yards and 6 touchdowns. He played in all 12 games. His best game came against Towson, where he had eight catches for 142 yards and two touchdowns.

Professional career
In May 2019, Papale had mini-camp tryouts with the Oakland Raiders and Washington Redskins.

In May 2020, he signed with the Montreal Alouettes of the Canadian Football League (CFL). The season was canceled due to the COVID-19 pandemic and he was released in October.

Papale signed with the Conquerors of The Spring League in 2020. He previously had tryouts in the XFL. He remained with the Conquerors for the 2021 The Spring League season.

Papale was selected in the 17th round of the 2022 USFL Draft by the Tampa Bay Bandits.

After the 2022 USFL season, Papale and all other Tampa Bay Bandits players were all transferred to the Memphis Showboats after it was announced that the Bandits were taking a hiatus and that the Showboats were joining the league.

Personal life
Vinny is the son of former Philadelphia Eagles receiver Vince Papale, whose career was the basis of the 2006 film Invincible.

References

1996 births
Living people
Delaware Fightin' Blue Hens football players
Montreal Alouettes players
The Spring League players
Bishop Eustace Preparatory School alumni
People from Cherry Hill, New Jersey
Sportspeople from Camden County, New Jersey
Tampa Bay Bandits (2022) players